Faites-moi confiance, is a French comedy film from 1954, directed by Gilles Grangier, written by Francis Blanche, starring Zappy Max and Louis de Funès.

Plot
The unsuccessful illusionist "Happy Max" intends to marry Hélène Bombardon, the daughter of his boss. This news makes Mr Bombardon so upset that he threatens "Happy Max" to fire him unless he finally creates a really successful stage performance.

Cast 
 Zappy Max as Happy Max, the unsuccessful illusionist
 André Gabriello as Mr Bombardon, the boss of the music hall
 Jacqueline Noëlle as Gilda
 Francis Blanche as Nicolas
 Jeanne Fusier-Gir as Mrs Créture
 Colette Ripert as Hélène Bombardon, the daughter of the boss
 Jean-Marc Tennberg as Maklouf
 Pierre Larquey as Merlin 
 Jérôme Goulven as Charlie
 Robert Rollis as Cliquet
 François Joux as Kodifu
 Jean-Pierre Vaguer as Klakmouf
 Louis Blanche as the baron
 Jean Hebey as Kapok
 Serge Berri or Jacques Marin as Bob
 René Marc as Grégory
 Louis de Funès as Tumlatum

References

External links 
 
 Faites-moi confiance (1953) at the Films de France

1954 films
French comedy films
1950s French-language films
French black-and-white films
Films directed by Gilles Grangier
Films scored by Gérard Calvi
1954 comedy films
1950s French films